Neferkare Shabaka, or Shabako (Egyptian: 𓆷𓃞𓂓 šꜣ bꜣ kꜣ, Assyrian:  Sha-ba-ku-u) was the third Kushite pharaoh of the Twenty-fifth Dynasty of Egypt, who reigned from 705 to 690 BC. The Greek sources called him Sabacon (Σαβακῶν) and is mentioned by both Herodotus and Manetho.

Shabaka's timeline
The archaeological evidence now in 2016–2017 firmly favours a Shebitku-Shabaka succession. Gerard Broekman's GM 251 (2017) paper shows that Shebitku reigned before Shabaka since the upper edge of Shabaka's NLR #30's Year 2 Karnak quay inscription was carved over the left-hand side of the lower edge of Shebitku's NLR#33 Year 3 inscription. This can only mean that Shabaka ruled after Shebitku. The Egyptologist Claus Jurman's personal re-examination of the Karnak quay inscriptions of Shebitku (or Shabataka) and Shabaka in 2016 and 2017 conclusively demonstrate that Shebitku ruled before Shabaka and corroborates Broekman's arguments that Shebitku's Nile Text inscription was carved before Shabaka's inscription; hence, Shebitku ruled before Shabaka.

Critically, Frederic Payraudeau writes in French that "the Divine Adoratrix or God's Wife of Amun Shepenupet I, the last Libyan Adoratrix, was still alive during the reign of Shebitku because she is represented performing rites and is described as "living" in those parts of the Osiris-Héqadjet chapel built during his reign (wall and exterior of the gate) In the rest of the room, it is Amenirdis I, Shabaka's sister), who is represented with the Adoratrix title and provided with a coronation name. The succession Shepenupet I—Amenirdis I as God's Wife of Amun or Divine Adoratrix thus took place during the reign of Shebitku. This detail in itself is sufficient to show that the reign of Shabaka cannot precede that of Shebitku.

The construction of the tomb of Shebitku (Ku. 18) resembles that of Piye (Ku. 17) while that of Shabaka (Ku. 15) is similar to that of Taharqa (Nu. 1) and Tantamani (Ku. 16). This also favours a Shebitku-Shabaka succession in the 25th dynasty. One of the strongest evidence that Shabaka ruled after Shebitku was demonstrated by the architectural features of the Kushite royal pyramids in El Kurru. Only in the pyramids of Piye (Ku 17) and Shebitku (Ku 18) are the burial-chambers open-cut structures with a corbelled roof, whereas fully tunnelled burial chamber substructures are found in the pyramids of Shabaka (Ku 15), Taharqa (Nu 1) and Tantamani (Ku 16), as well as with all subsequent royal pyramids in El Kurru and Nuri. The fully tunnelled and once decorated burial chamber of Shabaka's pyramid was clearly an architectural improvement since it was followed by Taharqa and all his successors. The pyramid design evidence also shows that Shabaka must have ruled after—and not before—Shebitku.

In the Cairo CG 42204 of the High Priest of Amun, Haremakhet—son of Shabaka—calls himself as "king's son of Shabaka, justified, who loves him, Sole Confidant of king Taharqa, justified, Director of the palace of the king of Upper and Lower Egypt Tanutamun/Tantamani, may he live for ever." However, no mention of Haremakhet's service under Shebitku is made; even if Haremakhet was only a youth under Shebitku, this king's absence is strange since the intent of the statue's text was to render a chronological sequence of kings who reigned during Horemakhet's life, each of their names being accompanied by a reference to the relationship that existed between the king mentioned and Horemakhet. This implies that when Haremakhet was born, king Shebitku was already dead, which would favour a Shebitku-Shabaka succession.

Payraudeau notes that Shebitku's shabtis are small (about 10 cm) and have a very brief inscription with only the king's birth name in a cartouche preceded by "the Osiris, king of Upper and Lower Egypt" and followed by mȝʿ-ḫrw. They are thus very close to those of Piye/Piankhy [42 – D. Dunham, (see footnote 39), plate 44.]. However, Shabaka's shabtis are larger (about 15–20 cm) with more developed inscriptions, including the quotation from the Book of the Dead, which is also present on those Taharqo, Tanouetamani and Senkamanisken." All this evidence suggests that Shebitku ruled before Shabaka. Finally, Payraudeau observes that in the traditional Shebitku-Shabaka chronology, the time span between the reign of Taharqa and Shabaka seems to be excessively long. He notes that Papyrus Louvre E 3328c from Year 2 or Year 6 of Taharqa mentions the sale of a slave by his owner who had bought him in Year 7 of Shabaka, that is 27 years earlier in the traditional chronology but if the reign of Shabaka is placed just before that of Taharqa (with no intervening reign of Shebitku), there is a gap of about 10 years which is much more credible.

The German scholar Karl Jansen Winkeln also endorsed a Shebitku-Shabaka succession in a JEH 10 (2017) N.1 paper titled 'Beiträge zur Geschichte der Dritten Zwischenzeit', Journal of Egyptian History 10 (2017), pp. 23–42 when he wrote a postscript stating "Im Gegensatz zu meinen Ausführungen auf dem [2014] Kolloquium in Münster bin ich jetzt der Meinung, dass die (neue) Reihenfolge Schebitku—Schabako in der Tat richtig ist..." or 'In contrast to my exposition at the [2014] Munster colloquium, I am now of the opinion that the (new) succession Shebitku-Shabako is in fact correct...'

Family

Shabaka is thought to be the son of King Kashta and Pebatjma, although a text from the time of Taharqa could be interpreted to mean that Shabaka was a brother of Taharqa and hence a son of Piye.

Shabaka's Queen Consort was Qalhata, according to Assyrian records, a sister of Taharqa. Shabaka and Qalhata were the parents of King Tantamani and possibly the parents of King Shebitku as well, but this conflicts with evidence in favor of Shabaka ruling after Shebitku.

It is possible that Queen Tabekenamun was a wife of Shabaka. She is thought by some to be a wife of Taharqa.

Shabaka's son Haremakhet became High Priest of Amun and is known from a statue and a fragment of a statue found in Karnak. A lady named Mesbat is mentioned on the sarcophagus of Haremakhet and may be his mother.

Shabaka is the father of at least two more children, but the identity of their mother is not known. Piankharty later became the wife of her (half-)brother Tantamani. She is depicted on the Dream Stela with him. Isetemkheb H likely married Tantamani as well. She was buried in Abydos, Egypt.

Biography

Shabaka succeeded his uncle Shebitku on the throne, and adopted the throne name of the Sixth Dynasty ruler Pepi II Neferkare. Shabaka's reign was initially dated from 716 BC to 702 BC by Kenneth Kitchen. However, new evidence indicates that Shebitku died around 705 BC because Sargon II (722–705 BC) of Assyria states in an official inscription at Tang-i Var (in northwest Iran)—which is datable to 706 BC—that it was Shebitku, Shabaka's predecessor, who extradited Iamanni of Ashdod to Shebitku as king of Egypt. This view has been accepted by many Egyptologists today such as Aidan Dodson, Rolf Krauss, David Aston, and Karl Jansen-Winkeln among others because there is no concrete evidence for coregencies or internal political/regional divisions in the Nubian kingdom during the Twenty-fifth Dynasty. This point was also stressed by Dan'el Kahn in a 2006 article. All contemporary records suggest that the Nubian Pharaohs ruled Egypt with only a single king on the throne, while Taharqa states explicitly on one of his Kawa steles that he assumed power only after the death of his brother, Shebitku.

Shabaka's reign is significant because he consolidated the Nubian Kingdom's control over all of Egypt from Nubia down to the Delta region. It also saw an enormous amount of building work undertaken throughout Egypt, especially at the city of Thebes, which he made the capital of his kingdom. In Karnak he erected a pink granite statue of himself wearing the twin crowns of Egypt. Shabaka succeeded in preserving Egypt's independence from outside foreign powers—especially the Neo-Assyrian Empire of Sargon II. The most famous relic from Shabaka's reign is the Shabaka Stone which records several Old Kingdom documents that the king ordered preserved.

Also notable is the Shabaka Gate, a large stone door unearthed by archeologists in 2011 and believed to have guarded the room where the king's treasures were stored. Despite being relative newcomers to Egypt, Shabaka and his family were immensely interested in Egypt's past and the art of the period reflects their tastes which harked back to earlier periods.

Death
Shabaka is assumed to have died in his 15th regnal year based on BM cube statue 24429, which is dated to Year 15, II Shemu day 11 of Shabaka's reign. Shabaka was buried in a pyramid at el-Kurru and was succeeded by his nephew Taharqa.

Image gallery

References

External links

700s BC deaths
8th-century BC Pharaohs
7th-century BC Pharaohs
8th-century BC monarchs of Kush
7th-century BC monarchs of Kush
Pharaohs of the Twenty-fifth Dynasty of Egypt
Egyptian people of Nubian descent
Year of birth unknown